Fay-Cooper Cole (8 August 1881 – 3 September 1961) was a professor of anthropology and founder of the anthropology department at the University of Chicago; he was a student of Franz Boas. Most famously, he was a witness for the defense for John Scopes at the Scopes Trial. He graduated from Northwestern University in 1903 and became Assistant Curator of Anthropology of at the Field Museum of Natural History the following year. He led the museum's Philippine expeditions, collecting more than 5,000 objects, traveling together with his wife, Mabel Cook Cole, with whom he co-authored The Story of Man. He helped establish the University of Chicago's graduate program in Anthropology and started an archeological survey of Illinois. Cole also played a central role in planning the anthropology exhibits for the 1933 Century of Progress World's Fair. He was elected a Member of the American Philosophical Society in 1941.

Works
 1912 Chinese pottery in the Philippines, Volume 12
 1933 The Long Road from Savagery to Civilization. New York and London: Century Co.
 1945 The Peoples of Malaysia. New York: Van Nostrand.
 1956 The Bukidnon of the Philippines. Chicago: Chicago Natural History Museum.

References

External links

References
Redman, Samuel J. Bone Rooms: From Scientific Racism to Human Prehistory in Museum (Cambridge: Harvard University Press). 2016.

1881 births
1961 deaths
University of Chicago faculty
Members of the American Philosophical Society
20th-century American anthropologists